Joyce Rebekah "Joy" Morrissey (née Inboden, 30 January 1981) is an American-born British politician who has served as the Conservative Member of Parliament (MP) for Beaconsfield in Buckinghamshire since 2019. Morrissey achieved ministerial rank as an Assistant Government Whip and has served in that role since July 2022 under three Prime Ministers. 

Morrissey grew up in the United States, moving to the United Kingdom in 2008 to attend the London School of Economics. Before doing so, in 1999 and 2000, Morrissey undertook humanitarian work in Albania, Kosovo, China and India, helping refugees, working in an orphanage and teaching English. Before her election to Parliament she worked at the Centre for Social Justice, as a Parliamentary staffer, and was elected a Councillor in Ealing.

Early life
Morrissey was born in Indiana, in the United States. She attended Worthington Christian High School in Ohio and graduated in 1999. Morrissey received a master's degree specialising in European Social Policy from the London School of Economics. After completing her postgraduate studies, Morrissey attained British citizenship and is now a British-American dual national.

Political career

London 
Morrissey was an elected a Conservative councillor on Ealing Council, where she represented the ward of Hanger Hill (named after the area of the same name) until April 2020.

She was a London-wide list candidate at the 2016 London Assembly election, but was not elected.

Morrissey contested Ealing Central and Acton at the 2017 general election. The seat was one of a number in London which had been marginal before the election, but the seat saw a large swing towards the incumbent Labour MP Rupa Huq.

In 2018, she sought nomination to be the London Conservatives mayoral candidate for the 2021 London mayoral election, making it through to the final three shortlist; Morrissey was ultimately not selected.

Member of Parliament 
In 2019, Morrissey was selected as the new Conservative candidate for Beaconsfield. At the 12 December election Morrissey defeated former Conservative Dominic Grieve, who had represented Beaconsfield since 1997 and contested the seat as an independent. Upon election she became the third ever American-born female MP, after The Viscountess Astor and Beatrice Rathbone.

In 2020, Morrissey was appointed Parliamentary Private Secretary (PPS) to the Foreign and Commonwealth Office.

In 2021, Morrissey was appointed PPS to the Deputy Prime Minister, Lord Chancellor, and Secretary of State for Justice, Dominic Raab.

In May 2021 Morrissey wrote an essay entitled "Importance of Apprenticeships and Technical Education" for inclusion in Common Sense: Conservative Thinking for a Post-Liberal Age published by the Common Sense Group, an informal group of Conservative MPs.

On 15 December 2021, Morrissey tweeted criticising the influence that unelected public health officials were able to exert on public policy during the Covid-19 pandemic, arguing that policy decisions should be made by those accountable to the public.

On 8 February 2022, Morrissey was appointed as a PPS to the Prime Minister, working alongside Lia Nici and James Duddridge.

Morrissey endorsed Liz Truss in the July–September 2022 Conservative Party leadership election.

Morrissey was appointed Assistant Government Whip on 8 July 2022 by the outgoing Johnson administration. On 8 September 2022 she was reappointed an Assistant Government Whip as part of the new Government of Prime Minister Liz Truss, one of very few people to make the transition from the Johnson to the Truss administration. Joy Morrissey was one of the final ministerial appointments approved by Queen Elizabeth II.

On 27 October 2022 Morrissey was reappointed an Assistant Government Whip once again by her third Prime Minister, Rishi Sunak. She is one of only three MPs to be reappointed in three consecutive Conservative governments as a whip.

Acting career
In the late 2000s, Morrissey had a brief acting career. Under the name Joy Boden she appeared alongside Marisa Tomei in a TV movie titled The Rich Inner Life of Penelope Cloud, which she also produced, and which her now-husband directed. After becoming a mother, she decided not to return to the film industry, stating that she "actually looked at going back to get (her) PhD in International Development but got involved with the local Ealing Conservatives".

Filmography 
 The Rich Inner Life of Penelope Cloud (2007, TV movie)
 Geek Mythology (2008, video)
 Only One Can Play (2009, short film)

References

External links

 

1981 births
Living people
21st-century British actresses
21st-century British women politicians
Alumni of the London School of Economics
American emigrants to England
British monarchists
Conservative Party (UK) councillors
Conservative Party (UK) MPs for English constituencies
Councillors in the London Borough of Ealing
Female members of the Parliament of the United Kingdom for English constituencies
People from Buckinghamshire
People from Indiana
People from the London Borough of Ealing
UK MPs 2019–present
Women councillors in England
Parliamentary Private Secretaries to the Prime Minister